The Gold Coast Suns are a professional Australian rules football club based in Gold Coast, Queensland. The club was granted a licence to join the Australian Football League (AFL) as an expansion club in March 2009, and played its first match during the second round of the 2011 AFL season.

In preparation for the club's entry into the league, Gold Coast was provided with a range of recruitment concessions by the AFL, including additional selections in the 2010 AFL draft, early access to recruit underaged players, and access to existing clubs' out-of-contract players in the preceding offseason. The club was also allowed to operate with an increased playing list size and salary cap in its first four seasons, before these allowances were reduced to be in line with the existing AFL clubs from 2015 as planned.

The maximum playing list size of each AFL club is 47 players, consisting of 38–40 senior-listed players and the remainder as rookie-listed players. Rookie players receive a reduced salary in comparison to senior-listed players, and are not necessarily automatically eligible for selection in games. As every club is required to make a minimum of three changes to its list at the end of each season, not every player necessarily makes a senior appearance for the club before being removed from the playing list. 

Since its first competitive appearance, 112 players have represented the club in an AFL premiership match. The premiership competition is inclusive of home-and-away and finals series matches only, and does not include pre-season matches or representative games (such as State of Origin or International rules football). As of the conclusion of the 2018 season, the player with the highest individual games tally for Gold Coast is Jarrod Harbrow, who has played 154 matches for the club since 2011. Tom Lynch has scored the most goals for the club, attaining 254 goals in his 131 matches.

Players

Other listed players

Notes

References

External links 
 Gold Coast – All Time Player List from AFL Tables

Gold Coast Suns

Gold Coast Football Club
Gold Coast, Queensland-related lists